Chaghcharan Airport is located in the eastern section of Chaghcharan, which is the capital of Ghor Province in Afghanistan. It is a domestic airport under the country's Ministry of Transport and Civil Aviation (MoTCA), and serves the population of Ghor and nearby provinces. Security in and around the airport is provided by the Afghan National Security Forces.

It is capable of supporting small to medium (C130) sized aircraft. The Hari River runs south and east of the airport. The International Security Assistance Force (ISAF) became occupants of the airport until their mission ended in late 2014. It was developed and made more useful during that time.

The other closest airports to Chaghcharan are: Maymana Airport in Faryab Province to the north; Bamyan Airport in Bamyan Province to the east; Nili Airport in Daykundi Province to the southeast; Bost Airport in Helmand Province to the southwest; Farah Airport in Farah Province to the southwest; Herat International Airport in Herat Province to the west; and Qala i Naw Airport in Badghis Province to the northwest.

Airlines and destinations

See also
List of airports in Afghanistan

References

External links 
 Chaghcharan Airport opening ceremony - made by CCR PRT PIO OF1 Paulius Babilas (1)
 Airport Records by Dr. Günther Eichhorn
 

Airports in Afghanistan
Ghor Province